TBS Education, formerly Toulouse Business School and Groupe ESC Toulouse (École supérieure de Commerce de Toulouse), is a triple crown business school founded in 1903 by the Toulouse Chamber of Commerce and Industry. This highly selective grande école (institute of higher education recruiting students from 2 year post-baccalaureat preparatory classes) offers several types of training ranging from Bachelors (bac + 3) and Masters (bac + 5) in the field of management, including the most prestigious of them called the "Grande Ecole" Program (PGE), and a joint DBA (bac + 8) with the University of Toulouse, Toulouse School of Management. It holds triple accreditation EQUIS, AACSB and AMBA and is a member of both the Federal University of Toulouse Midi-Pyrénées and the Conférence des grandes écoles (CGE). It offers business courses in English, French, and Spanish to over 7,000 students, many international, trained each year in its initial and continuing training programmes, and has business schools located in Toulouse, Paris, Barcelona, and Casablanca. Research is focused on emerging sectors, the school has developed two clusters: the first dedicated to Artificial Intelligence and data analysis, the second to aerospace mobility.

History
In 1902, a mixed committee representing the Chamber of Commerce and the municipality of Toulouse, opened a year of preparation for the entrance examination for a future grande école. The ESC Toulouse was founded in 1903 by the Toulouse Chamber of Commerce and Industry and recognized as a Consular Higher Education Institution (EESC) by the Ministry of Education in France. The school's initial vocation was to respond to the needs of the local business community for able business administrators. In 1947, a competitive examination, the structure of which is common to the twelve French business schools (grandes écoles de commerce), was set up. In 1982, the first specialized postgraduate training courses for specialized master's degrees (bac + 5) from the Conférence des grandes écoles were awarded.

In 2013, ESC Toulouse changed its name to Toulouse Business School, and in 2016, TBS moved from a non-profit status to that of an EESC (Établissement d’Enseignement Supérieur Consulaire – Consular Higher Education Establishment). In 2021, the name was changed to TBS Education to better reflect its multinational education and campuses.

1903 - École Supérieure de Commerce de Toulouse founded.
1947 - Competitive grandes écoles de commerce exam established with 12 French business schools.
1982 - Master's degree for Conférence des grandes écoles programs established.
1986 - Toulouse campus moved to the Compans-Caffarelli site in Toulouse.
1987 - Opening of the Marrakech Business School (Morocco)
1990 - Became part of the network of competitions of the common bank of tests (BCE).
1991 - Opening of the Silesian International Business School (Katowice, Poland) in collaboration with Strathclyde University (Glasgow, Scotland)
1995 - Opening of Escuela Superior Europea de Comercio (ESEC) in Barcelona, Spain. (now called: TBS Education - Barcelona)
2000 - Aerospace MBA. Knowledge and practices in management applied to aerospace activities, a program unique in Europe.
2001 - Marrakech campus moved to Casablanca, Morocco. (now called: TBS Education - Casablanca)
2001 - Toulouse Business School awarded EQUIS accreditation
2002 - Toulouse Business School awarded AMBA accreditation
2003 - Toulouse Business School awarded AACSB accreditation
2005 - Management Consulting MBA. Sponsorized by "Syntec Conseil en Management"
2006 - Doctor of Business Administration established, offered jointly with Toulouse School of Management, Toulouse 1 University Capitole (l'université Toulouse-I-Capitole)
2007 - Université de Toulouse, Research and Higher Education Cluster (PRES) created. TBS forms a consortium with 14 grandes écoles and public universities in Toulouse. 
2007 - TBS Foundation created, to promote teaching, learning and educational transformation and excellence. 
2010 - Toulouse campus inaugurated a new building: the Bosco for specialized masters and the Aerospace MBA program 
2011 - Toulouse campus inaugurated a new building: Alaric for the new media library.
2012 - TBSeeds incubator created, to promote startup businesses. Certified by French Tech.
2015 - Université fédérale de Toulouse Midi-Pyrénées ComUE created, replacing PRES.
2022 - Barcelona campus moved to the 22@ district of innovation site in Barcelona.
2022 - License awarded for the Bachelor program for the maximum duration of 4 years; accrediting visa for the Grande École Program Master's degree renewed.

Grande École System 

TBS Education is a Grande école, a French institution of higher education that is separate from, but parallel and connected to the main framework of the French public university system. Similar to the Ivy League in the United States, Oxbridge in the UK, and C9 League in China, Grandes Écoles are elite academic institutions that admit students through an extremely competitive process. Alums go on to occupy elite positions within government, administration, and corporate firms in France.

Although they are more expensive than public universities in France, Grandes Écoles typically have much smaller class sizes and student bodies, and many of their programs are taught in English. International internships, study abroad opportunities, and close ties with government and the corporate world are a hallmark of the Grandes Écoles. Many of the top ranked business schools in Europe are members of the Conférence des Grandes Écoles (CGE), as is TBS, and out of the 250 business schools in France, only 39 are CGE members.

Degrees from TBS are accredited by the Conférence des Grandes Écoles and awarded by the Ministry of National Education (France). TBS is further accredited by the elite international business school accrediting organizations and it holds the much coveted Triple accreditation: The European Foundation for Management Development (EQUIS), The Association to Advance Collegiate Schools of Business (AACSB), and Association of MBAs (AMBA)

Business school rankings 

In 2022,the Financial Times ranked TBS Education: 55th among European Business Schools, its Masters in Management 42nd, and its eMBA 41st.

Campuses 

TBS Education has business and management schools in these cities: Toulouse, Barcelona, Casablanca, and Paris.

TBS is also founding member of the Federal University of Toulouse Midi-Pyrénées, the association of universities and higher education institutions (ComUE), which is reconstituting the collective Université de Toulouse. As a full-fledged member, TBS coordinates the training offers and the research and transfer strategies of 31 public university and research establishments within the Occitanie region, has its own budgetary allocation, and can issue diplomas. Among others, this membership includes all large campuses in Toulouse: Capitole University, Jean Jaurès, Paul Sabatier University, Sciences Po Toulouse, INSA Toulouse, ISAE-SUPAERO, as well as the 7 grandes écoles of the National Polytechnic Institute of Toulouse. As a collective higher education structure, it is the fourth largest in France with over 130,000 students, faculty, and staff.

Partnerships and alliances 

Within the Université de Toulouse, TBS awards double-diplomas with: Science Po Toulouse (politics, international relations, public administration); ENAC (air transport and aeronautics management); IMT Mines Albi (Engineering-manager); INSA Toulouse (large industries and enterprises); and the public IAE Toulouse: Toulouse School of Management (Ph.D., management). The TBS Research Centre also partners with doctoral programme students from the Toulouse School of Management, and serves on its board of directors. Internationally, TBS partners with over 200 universities worldwide and several of its partners offer dual degrees.

Exchange
Arizona State University, Tempe, Az, US
San Jose State University, San Jose, Ca, US
San Diego State University, San Diego, Ca, US
California State University, Stanislaus, Ca, US
Nottingham Trent University, Nottingham, UK
University of Exeter, Exeter, UK
University of Hull, Hull, UK
Glasgow Caledonian University, Glasgow, UK
ESIC Business & Marketing School, Madrid, Spain
University of Johannesburg, Johannesburg, South Africa
University of Ljubljana, Ljubljana, Slovenia
Singapore Management University, Singapore
University of South Australia, Adelaide, Australia
Université de Liège, Liège, Belgium
Maastricht University, Maastricht, Netherlands
Frankfurt School of Finance & Management, Frankfurt, Germany
University of Victoria, Victoria, Canada

Dual Bachelors 
European University Viadrina, Brandenburg, Germany
Nagoya University of Commerce and Business, Nagoya, Japan
Universitas Gadjah Mada, Yogyakarta, Indonesia
Soochow University, Taipai, Taiwan

Dual Masters
Université Laval, Québec, Canada
University College Dublin, Dublin, Ireland
University of Strathclyde, Glasgow, UK
University of Bradford, Bardford, UK
Georgia State University, Atlanta, US
Universidad de Belgrano, Buenos Aires, Argentina
Universidad de Chile, Santiago, Chile
Universidad de los Andes, Bogota, Colombia

Research 

TBS Education has several centers of excellence, research laboratories, and doctoral programs.  Over the past 5 years, there have been 20 collaborative research projects resulting in more than 300 articles published in scientific journals, and another 180 books and chapters in these fields. In addition to its faculty and partnerships, TBS directs 25 doctoral students collaborating in this research.

Centers of Excellence: Aeronautics & Space; Artificial Intelligence & Business Analytics; Corporate & Social Responsibility / Sustainable Development; SIRIUS - Space, Business, and Law - a public-private partnership between TBS, Toulouse 1 Capitole University, CNES, Airbus Defense & Space and Thales Alenia Space, dedicated to the law and management of space sector activities.
Research Laboratories: Accounting, Management Control & Performance Management; Entrepreneurship & Strategies; Finance, Economics & Econometrics; Social & Innovation Marketing; Work, Employment, Health.
TBSeeds: An incubator for student and alumni entrepreneurs that has hosted 143 business startup projects with a 5-year survival rate of 70%. TBS offers personalized coaching, dedicated training sessions, and co-working spaces in order to transform a project into a business creation. The incubator pre-tests startups at each key stage, from the definition of the business model to the final presentation of the project.

Programmes 
In 2022, the management school TBS Education obtained the degree of License for its Bachelor program (Bac + 3) for the maximum duration of 4 years, as well as renewal of the accrediting visa for its Grande École Program Master's degree (Bac + 5). Higher education business degrees in France are organized into three levels thus facilitating international mobility: the Licence/Bachelor's, Master's, and Doctorate degrees. A Bachelor's degree requires the completion of 180 ECTS credits; a Master's, requires an additional 120 ECTS credits. The highly coveted Grande École Program (PGE) ends with the Master's in Management (M.M.) degree. Outside of the Grande École Program, students at TBS can be awarded other master's degrees, such as a Conference of Grande École Master of Science, the MBA (Bac + 5), or a Ph.D. (Bac + 8).

Undergraduate 
Bachelor / License  
With a focus on international business and business administration, this degree combines classroom training with practical experience by including 12 months of full-time internships, spread out over 3 years, 6 to 12 months at a TBS or partner campus abroad, and 50 hours of NGO support. The degree can be completed in English-only, French-only, or bilingual instruction, mastery of 2 foreign languages is required, and dual-degrees are optional. Core courses include: marketing, CSR / sustainable development, finance and accounting, economics, law, entrepreneurship, human resources, supply chain, and multicultural management. Concentration is available for these fields: Human Resources, Corporate Finance, Operational Marketing, International Business, Business Analytics. In addition, subject specialization in one of these areas is required:
 Aviation Management (English)
 Business Development (French)
 Digital Business / Marketing (English or French)
 Digital & Social Entrepreneurship (English)
 Event Management (French)
 Hospitality & Tourism Management (English)
 Innovation Management (English)
 Luxury and Fashion (English)
 Real Estate Management (French)
 Sustainable Business (English)
 Wine Marketing & Oenoturism (French)

Postgraduate 
Master of Business Administration

Aerospace MBA (taught in English) -- Toulouse is at the centre of the European aerospace industry, with the headquarters of Airbus, ATR, and SPOT satellite system, in addition to the Toulouse Space Centre and Aerospace Valley. Created in 1999, this triple accredited MBA targets Aerospace executives; with an alumni network of up to 500 graduates distributed over 5 continents and 67 countries.
Management Consulting MBA (taught in French) -- The Management Consulting MBA is a process focused program with a strong strategic orientation, deliberately adopting inter- and trans disciplinary orientation.

Master in Management
Students in this program receive a double-degree, either at a TBS partner university in France or abroad (over 100 partners) or an additional MSc from TBS. The degree includes a mandatory 6-month professional internship, and an optional professional gap year.
Finance
Management
Marketing
Business Analytics
Big data
International business
Entrepreneurship
Audit & controlling

MSc Equity Research and Investment
A university affiliation program with the CFA Institute, this finance program includes the CFA Candidate Body of Knowledge (CBOK) and prepares graduates for the three Chartered Financial Analyst exams. The coursework emphasizes: financial analysis; capital markets and fixed income investments; derivatives and risk management; portfolio management; investment strategies; corporate finance and applications; research methods; and ethics and economics for the CFA exam. Additionally, this degree provides two soft skills certifications: management and leadership; career agility. A thesis is required, and a 3 to 6 month internship is optional.

MSc Artificial Intelligence and Business Analytics
Analytical Theory, Methods and Models
Big Data Analytics
Programming
Artificial Intelligence
Data Management
Data Project Management
International Perspectives in Business Analytics and Artificial Intelligence
Business Analytics and Artificial Intelligence Research Methods and Dynamics

MSc Banking and Finance
Banking and Finance
Asset Management
Financial Engineering and Models
Legal Management in Business

MSc Control, Organization and Systems
Internal Audit and Management Accounting
Business Intelligence & Strategy
Logistics, Purchasing & International Trade
Logistics, Purchasing & International Trade, specialization Industrial Management
Information System Engineering & Management
Human Resources Management

MSc Fashion & Luxury Marketing
Marketing Foundations
Marketing in the Fashion & Luxury Industries
Team challenge: Partner brand operations within the Fashion & Luxury industries
Company consulting: strategic and operational issues with a TBS partner company
Study trips: guided visits, workshops, and talks with industry executives in Paris
Soft skills certification: Personal Skills; Leadership & Management; Relational Impact

MSc Marketing and Communication
Marketing Management & Communication (French track)
Marketing Management & Communication (French track based in Paris)
Marketing Management & Communication (English track)

MSc Innovation, Technology and Entrepreneurship
Industrial Company Lawyer
Entrepreneurship
Managing in Biotechnology Industry
Innovation & Technology Management

MSc Sectoral Management
Sport Management
Health Management: Industries in Health sector
Health Management: Health a& Social services
Managing in the Tourism Industry
Air Transport Management
Marketing & Food Processing Technology

Doctorate of Business Administration
Research-based training and original research in both managerial and theoretical problems. The research methodology is focused on decision-making process for business management, and the training is focused on professional standards of practice and high-level business skills and techniques.

Notable alumni

Virginie Calmels, French politician and former CEO of Canal+ and Endemol
Jörg Guido Hülsmann, German economist
Damien Adam, French Politician and Member of the French National Assembly
Axel de Tarlé, TV host and columnist on the economy for Europe 1 and France 5
Kamil H. Al-Awadhi, CEO of Kuwait Airways
Nicolas Todt, motorsport CEO and founder of ART Grand Prix
Jérôme Siméon, CEO of Capgemini
Hamid Sidine, COO of Millennium Hotels and Resorts, Middle East and Africa
Patrick Mwanri, CEO of Precision Air
Omar Kabbaj, advisor to King Mohammed VI of Morocco and former president of the African Development Bank
François Rivière, President of the French rugby union USA Perpignan
Renan Luce, singer and songwriter

References

Toulouse
University of Toulouse
Grandes écoles
Universities and colleges in Toulouse
Educational institutions established in 1903
1903 establishments in France